Sania Mirza and Barbora Strýcová were the defending champions, but chose not to participate this year.

Andreja Klepač and María José Martínez Sánchez won the title, defeating Daria Gavrilova and Daria Kasatkina in the final, 6–3, 6–2.

Seeds

Draw

References
Main Draw

Toray Pan Pacific Open - Doubles
Pan Pacific Open
2017 Toray Pan Pacific Open